The Witwer House is a historic house at 504 North 1st Street in Rockford, Illinois. The house was built in 1876 for Rockford alderman and merchant Benjamin Witwer and his wife. Builder O. H. Wheat designed the house in the Italianate style, which was popular nationally in the 1870s. The two-story brick house features a three-sided bay window in the center of the front facade, a recessed front porch, tall arched windows and doors, and a cross-gabled roof with Gothic-inspired decorative woodwork under the gables. The property also includes a brick carriage house built in 1879 with a similar design to the house.

The house was added to the National Register of Historic Places on August 26, 2021.

References

National Register of Historic Places in Winnebago County, Illinois
Houses on the National Register of Historic Places in Illinois
Italianate architecture in Illinois
Houses completed in 1876
Buildings and structures in Rockford, Illinois